The Rebel Alliance (formal: The Alliance to Restore the Republic) is a fictional, stateless, anti-imperialist, interstellar coalition of rebel dissidents and defectors of the Galactic Empire in the Star Wars franchise. The Alliance's goal is to restore the liberal governance of the previous Galactic Republic, which had been dissolved after its leader Palpatine seized absolute power and declared himself emperor. It is the main protagonist faction of the original Star Wars trilogy, parallel to the mostly fallen Jedi Order survived by Obi-Wan Kenobi, Yoda, and later Luke Skywalker.

As a direct reactionary movement to the formation of the Empire, the Rebel insurgency conducted covert operations on Imperial garrison-worlds and utilized a stateless strategy in conjunction with wolfpack-guerrilla warfare against the Imperial Fleet throughout the galaxy. Capital ships had no place in the Rebellion as these are expensive to build, maintain, and to keep fully crewed. The Rebellion was far too limited in both manpower and resources to justify putting so much of both into a giant target. When the Galactic Empire is capable of always fielding greater numbers and greater firepower, being able to hit high-valued targets and get out is much more important. While the Empire considers all dissent and rebellion as acts of extremism and terrorism in Imperial propaganda, the Alliance is described and portrayed in various Star Wars media as a group of resilient freedom fighters, based on tolerance, self-empowerment, and hope for a better future using insurgency weapons and tactics.

The Rebel Alliance was first featured as the main protagonist faction in the films A New Hope (1977), The Empire Strikes Back (1980) and Return of the Jedi (1983). The faction's origins were alluded to in Revenge of the Sith (2005), and their early activities are featured in the Disney XD television series Rebels, the anthology film Rogue One (2016), and the Disney+ series Andor.

Depiction

Origins

Founding members
 Senator Mon Mothma – Co-founder; current commander-in-chief 
 Senator Bail Organa – Co-founder; early constituting member and head of the Alliance Council
 Died during Episode IV: A New Hope, when the Death Star destroys Alderaan
 Senator Padmé Amidala – Co-founder; early constituting member. She died a few days after founding the Alliance. (While the scene from Revenge of the Sith was deleted from the film, the information was affirmed by other official sources. Scene still present on Disney+)
 Died during Episode III: Revenge of the Sith while giving birth to twins Luke and Leia; the latter was adopted by Organa.

Early insurgency 
There is no consensus on when the Rebel Alliance was formed, be it de jure or de facto. The three most commonly mentioned dates are:
 19 BBY with the Delegation of 2000 Senators which demanded Chancellor Palpatine to lay down his emergency powers;
 5 BBY with the formation of the rebel fleet and the start of major combat operations (beginning of the Age of Rebellion, ending in 4 ABY);
 2 BBY with Mon Mothma's formal Declaration of Rebellion after the Ghorman Massacre.

Delegation of 2000 (19 BBY) 
The earliest possible origins of the Alliance to Restore the Republic are told during the events of Revenge of the Sith (set in 19 BBY, 19 years before the Battle of Yavin IV portrayed in the first film A New Hope). In deleted scene 2 called "A Stirring in the Senate", a group of six Senators including Padmé Amidala, Mon Mothma and Bail Organa meet in the latter's office to discuss ways to counter the already unjustified extraordinary powers of Supreme Chancellor Palpatine "subverting the Constitution" as the Clone Wars were waning, with Mothma stating their goal was "preserving democracy within the Republic". Amidala was initially skeptical of Palpatine's evil intentions because he had supported her during the Trade Federation's occupation of Naboo (The Phantom Menace, 32 BBY), but Organa and Mon Mothma announced the formation of an anti-Palpatine 'organization'; the six Senators agreed to a pact of silence. In deleted scene 3 titled "Seeds of Rebellion" (in Amidala's apartment with two new Senators joining the group), it is explained that the Delegation of 2000 disgruntled Senators will present a petition to the Chancellor. Amidala was more willing to oppose Palpatine now, but wanted to involve the Jedi, at least Anakin Skywalker. However, aside from one Senator agreeing, the others doubted whether the Jedi Council would be loyal to the Republic or the Chancellor, and opted to wait. Amidala died in premature childbirth not long after her last-ditch attempt to prevent Anakin's fall. In The Imperial Handbook, Grand Moff Tarkin related that most members of the Delegation of 2000 were arrested; Mothma and Organa retained their Senatorship by remaining outwardly obedient to Palpatine, while secretly leading  the unification of disparate bands of insurgents into what they termed the Rebel Alliance'.

First major battles, rebel fleet (5 BBY) 
The Disney series Rebels depicts the development of the rebellion against the Galactic Empire beginning five years before A New Hope (5 BBY) and fourteen years after the fall of the Galactic Republic and the Jedi Order in Revenge of the Sith (19 BBY). The show focuses on a motley group of rebels (all of whom have been affected by the Empire in one form or another) that banded together aboard a freighter starship called Ghost. They called themselves the Spectres and were led by Hera Syndulla. By the end of the first season, it is revealed that there were various clandestine cell systems that were resisting the Empire, such as Jun Sato's Phoenix Squadron. Senator Bail Organa (along with his wife, queen Breha Organa) of Alderaan and former Jedi Ahsoka Tano both play a pivotal role in coordinating these splinter cells into a legitimate threat capable of challenging Imperial rule. Funded primarily by the Royal House of Alderaan, the alliance began to allocate resources towards a united front against Imperial rule. The Spectres and Phoenix Squadron were later integrated into the Massassi Group based on Yavin 4, which by Rogue One (1 BBY) and A New Hope (0 BBY) was commanded by General Jan Dodonna. One last important rebel cell that later became part of the Rebel Alliance was the Mon Calamari Exodus Fleet, commanded by Admiral Raddus and Admiral Ackbar, formed out of civilian spacecraft during the Imperial occupation of Mon Cala in 18 BBY (1 year into the Empire, 18 years prior to the Battle of Yavin).

Declaration of Rebellion (2 BBY) 
Near the end of the third season of Rebels, in "Secret Cargo", Alliance co-founder Senator Mon Mothma, escaped assassination for condemning the Ghorman Massacre and speaking out against the Emperor (2 BBY). She called out to the various rebel cells and insurgency factions to unite into a unified coalition:

Many Rebel ships arrive at a rendezvous point above Dantooine to unite and form the "Alliance to Restore the Republic".

Government

Senior civil government and military high command
 Gial Ackbar – Admiral and Commander of the Alliance Fleet at the Battle of Endor.
 Cassian Andor – Pilot and Intelligence Officer.
 Killed in action during Rogue One: A Star Wars Story, in the Battle of Scarif.
 Crix Madine – General of the Alliance Special Forces.
 Ahsoka Tano – Former Jedi Padawan; covert operations spymaster and first 'Fulcrum' agent.
 Breha Organa – Adoptive mother of Leia Organa; ruling monarch of Alderaan; manager of the Rebel Alliance's funds, as revealed in the 2017 novel, Leia: Princess of Alderaan. Played a pivotal role in securing Alderaan's support for the Rebel Alliance as its primary galactic advocate.
 Killed during Episode IV: A New Hope, when the Death Star destroys Alderaan.
 Wedge Antilles – Commander of Rogue Squadron.
 Raymus Antilles – Captain of the famous Alderaanian cruiser Tantive IV. Escort to members of the Royal House of Alderaan.
 Killed in action during Episode IV: A New Hope by Darth Vader.
 Lando Calrissian – General and former Cloud City administrator.
 Carlist Rieekan – General and Commander of the Alliance's Echo Base on Hoth.
 Jan Dodonna – General and Commander of the Alliance's Base One on Yavin 4.
 Hera Syndulla – General and pilot of the Ghost.
 Luke Skywalker – Commander and Jedi Knight; former Commander of Rogue Squadron and former Grand Master of the New Jedi Order.
 Leia Organa – Representative of the planet Alderaan in the Imperial Senate and Senior diplomat of the Alliance; General of the Resistance.
 Han Solo – General and former smuggler pilot of the Millennium Falcon.

Military
The Alliance Military and its activities were overseen by Alliance High Command, who managed the logistical and strategic matters of the Rebellion's efforts against the dominant Galactic Empire. Alliance Intelligence was headed by Spymaster Bail Organa and Spymaster Ahsoka Tano, which proved essential for maintaining communications, finding missions for the various Alliance Cells, and coordinating the Alliance's highly decentralized structure. At the time of the Battle of Endor, its chief commanders were: Gial Ackbar serving as Admiral of the Alliance Starfleet; Jan Dodonna serving as General of the Alliance Grand Army; Crix Madine serving as General of Alliance Pathfinders.

Alliance Grand Army 
The Alliance military could never decisively win a "land war" with the Empire. Generally speaking, the quality of Alliance infantry varied greatly by unit. Due to the highly decentralized structure of the Alliance, these units often operated independently with little oversight, and were frequently lacking in discipline, equipment, intelligence and combat skills. They often consisted of convicts, street thugs, pirates, outlaws, and anyone whose profession placed them at odds with the Empire. These infantry were tolerated by Alliance Command, both for their willingness to mount an insurgency against the Empire, and for their expendability.

Alliance Pathfinders 
Mission critical operations were carried out by few standardized special forces units, dubbed "pathfinders", who had previous military training for infiltration, asymmetrical warfare, and were capable of operating without resupply. Pathfinders volunteered in the Battle of Scarif under Cassian Andor, and spearheaded the ground assault during the Battle of Endor.

Alliance Starfleet 
The Alliance military largely consisted of mothballed, improvised, repurposed, or stolen civilian ships from dozens of manufacturers; they lacked the means, resources or shipyards to build, maintain and crew thousands of military-grade capital ships. The Alliance constantly had to change bases and their carrier ships routinely had to escape into hyperspace before recovering their fighter complement. The biggest and most powerful warship they had available were several MC80 star cruisers supplied to the Alliance by Mon Calamari, but the Alliance Fleet kept these in reserve and never risked deploying them, even when strategically-critical bases in Atollon, Yavin, and Hoth came under siege. The Alliance fleet is geared towards fabian strategy, space superiority, wolfpack operations, hit-and-run tactics, secret missions, subterfuge, and general elements of a stateless military grand strategy. They used gunships and corvettes to screen Imperial starfighters. Their warships carried a complement of expensive starfighters equipped with FTL hyperdrives and deflector shields that traveled alongside the fleet. This was in contrast to Imperial naval doctrine, whose TIE-series starfighters were lightly armored and lacked hyperdrives to lower unit cost and discourage pilot defection. The Alliance's focus on small light combat ships and on starfighters allowed them to effectively fight the Galactic Empire's well-funded and well-armed military.

The Alliance Starfleet almost never placed their ships at risk; they avoided pitched battles, frontal assaults, wars of attrition and conventional, symmetric engagements with the Imperials at all costs. Instead of engaging the Imperials in open firefights, the Rebel Alliance largely embraced flexible non-committal attack tactics utilizing mainly fast attack CR90 corvettes supplied to the Alliance by Alderaan. The Imperial leadership considered collateral damage as "acceptable margins" in rooting out insurgents; this contrasted against the Alliance's surgical precision to avoid civilian casualties. To minimize losses, the Alliance military leadership heavily favored carrier battle groups supporting starfighter strike crafts for fast-attack style of warfare, thereby leveraging a decisive advantage over the Galactic Empire's "big powerful ships" doctrine. Anti-Imperial operations emphasized depredation and delayed actions, covertly relocating compromised bases to another secured system, interdiction in slowing down the Imperials' momentum, and inflicting maximum damage on the enemy without, in principle, becoming decisively engaged.

Alliance Starfighter Corps 
The Alliance finds its strength almost entirely in the starfighter arena, offering some of the most effective and versatile small strike craft within Star Wars canon. The Alliance was plagued by lack of resources: it was low on fighters, manpower, real estate. Jan Dodonna believed unsupported hyperspace-capable starfighters could undermine the Empire's control of space and demonstrated this to the galaxy by winning high-profile victories: Star Destroyers, shipyards, local fleets and the Death Star. Despite the Corps' high-maintenance costs and being chronically understaffed, with starfighter logistics, aerospace engineers and veteran pilots being limited in numbers, the Alliance doctrine—raiding targets before they could mount a defense, then leaving—proved flawless in singling out vulnerable targets and attacking only when they had strength, and only when the results were spectacular. Seventy percent of sorties were reconnaissance missions: finding targets for starfighter raids became the top priority of Alliance intelligence. The introduction of the A-wing, B-wing and X-wing, along with the former Imperial officers who piloted them, only improved upon that advantage.

Gold Squadron, commanded by Jon Vander, was an BTL-A4 Y-wing light bomber squadron that served as part of the Rebel Alliance's elite starfighter corps during the Galactic Civil War. This unit was instrumental in escorting Senator Mon Mothma safely to Dantooine, participated in the Battle of Scarif, and was nearly wiped out by Darth Vader in the Battle of Yavin. Under the command of Lando Calrissian, it succeeded in destroying the second Death Star's reactor during the Battle of Endor.
Green Squadron, commanded by Arvel Crynyd, was a RZ-1 A-wing interceptor squadron that served as part of the Rebel Alliance's starfighter corps during the Galactic Civil War. The squadron most notably participated in the Alliance's most decisive campaigns, including: the Battle of Atollon; the Battle of Scarif; and the Battle of Endor. It was Arvel Cyrnyd who crashed his A-wing into the bridge of the Executor, thereby disabling the ship.
Red Squadron, commanded by Garven Dreis, was a T-65B X-wing starfighter squadron that served as part of the Rebel Alliance's starfighter corps during the Galactic Civil War. The squadron most notably participated in the Alliance's most decisive campaigns, including: the Battle of Scarif; the Battle of Vrogas Vas; the Battle of Hoth; and the Battle of Endor.
Blue Squadron, commanded by Antoc Merrick, was an airspeeder and starfighter squadron that served as part of the Rebel Alliance's elite starfighter corps during the Galactic Civil War. The squadron most notably participated in the Alliance's most decisive campaigns, including: the Battle of Scarif; the Siege on Tureen VII; the Battle of Hoth; and the Battle of Endor.
Rogue Squadron, commanded by Wedge Antilles, was a starfighter squadron in the Star Wars franchise. The squadron appears in The Empire Strikes Back (1980) as "Rogue Group". In the 2016 film Rogue One, Rebel fighters on a suicide mission to steal the plans for the Death Star (which causes the Battle of Scarif) self-identify as "Rogue One", a possible precursor to Rogue Squadron.

Galactic Civil War

The fall of the Old Republic and the birth of the Empire, as depicted in Revenge of the Sith, marked the beginning of the bloody Galactic Civil War.

Decisive losses and victories
The Rebels episode, "Zero Hour", demonstrates the Imperials' absolute naval supremacy when they successfully entrapped the "Phoenix Fleet" during the Battle of Atollon, and forced them in engaging on equal footing; resulting a decisive victory for the Imperials and the total decimation of the Rebel fleet.

During the events of Rogue One and A New Hope, the Alliance learns of the construction of the 'Death Star', an enormous superweapon capable of obliterating entire planets, intended to cement the Empire's rule of terror. Intelligence gathered reveals that a Death Star engineer antipathetic to the causes of the Empire had intentionally included a design flaw that, if exploited, could bring down the entire station. With the help of the Rogue One squad led by Jyn Erso and Cassian Andor, a Rebel assault on an Imperial facility on the heavily-defended planet Scarif successfully manages to capture schematics of the Death Star. The Battle of Scarif was the first major engagement against the Empire, and ended in a pyrrhic victory; all members of Rogue One are killed in action, and the Rebel fleet was decimated.

After successfully capturing the Death Star plans, Alderaanian soldiers aboard a Mon Calamari flagship barely manage to escape the 501st Legion and Death Squadron with the stolen data plans. Right after the battle, the Tantive IV, an Alderaanian corvette carrying Princess Leia Organa is captured by Vader's flagship, Imperial I-class Star Destroyer Devastator, while attempting to deliver the plans to Bail Organa on Alderaan. All members of the Alderaanian Consular Security onboard are either killed or taken prisoner and Princess Leia Organa is held hostage for a time by Darth Vader. In order to punish both her and her home planet government's central involvement in the Rebel Alliance, Leia is forced to witness Alderaan's destruction by the Death Star. The Princess is subsequently rescued by Luke Skywalker, Han Solo, Chewbacca, and Obi-Wan Kenobi, who then deliver the station schematics to the Alliance. Subsequent analysis of the schematics reveals the critical vulnerability to be an exhaust port leading directly to the station's reactor core.

The Empire discovers the location of the primary Alliance headquarters on a moon of the planet Yavin through a tracking device covertly planted on Han Solo's vessel, and deploys the Death Star to destroy the base and crush the insurgency once and for all. During the ensuing battle of Yavin, Rebel starfighter squadrons lead an assault on the Death Star in a last-ditch attempt to exploit the vulnerability before it could fire upon the Rebel base. Despite fighters sustaining heavy losses, one pilot—the Force-sensitive Luke Skywalker—successfully guides torpedoes down the exhaust port. The Death Star is obliterated in a catastrophic explosion, and the battle ends in a decisive Rebel victory.

In the Star Wars comics, the Rebellion wins numerous victories against the Empire after the destruction of the Death Star, destroying its major weapons factory on Cymoon 1, breaking an Imperial blockade around the Rebel world of Tureen VII by stealing the Imperial I-class Star Destroyer Harbinger and recruiting the Mon Calamari trading fleet to be refitted as an assault fleet. Such firepower would finally allow the Alliance to attack the Empire on a larger scale. However, one of the Rebellion's allies, Queen Trios of Shu-Torun (whose world's technology had been fitted into the ships of the new Rebel fleet), revealed herself as an undercover Imperial agent sent by Darth Vader to sabotage their efforts. With their ships unexpectedly paralyzed by the Shu-Torun technology, the gathered Rebel fleet could do little as they were targeted for destruction by Vader's Imperial fleet. Half the Rebel ships were destroyed in the battle before Leia found a way around the sabotage and allowed the remaining ships to escape. However, Generals Jan Dodonna and Davits Draven, as well as several other high-ranking Rebel officers, were killed during the battle and the remaining Rebel ships were separated in their flight. Mon Mothma instructed all Rebel cells to regroup in time while striking out at the Empire when and how they could. Not until the Battle of Endor would the whole force of the Rebellion be once again united in a single place.

In The Empire Strikes Back, the Alliance suffers a crushing defeat on Hoth when one of their main command centers, Echo Base, is overrun by the Darth Vader's elite personal Imperial armed forces, the Death Squadron and the 501st Legion. The remaining forces of the Rebellion are forced to stay mobile, using Admiral Ackbar's flagship, Home One, as their headquarters.

By Return of the Jedi, the Alliance has regrouped and learned that a second, more powerful Death Star is being constructed, and will be completed under Emperor Palpatine's personal supervision. Mon Mothma has Admiral Ackbar and Lando Calrissian command the Alliance fleet and dispatches Han Solo and Princess Leia in leading Alliance's elite special forces to disable the station's defenses while Luke distracts Darth Vader. The Alliance subsequently wins the Battle of Endor, in which Emperor Palpatine, Darth Vader, the Death Squadron-Imperial armada, and much of the Imperial hierarchy are killed in action. The loss of the second Death Star and other invaluable Imperial naval assets, along with the deaths of Imperial leaders aboard, marked the beginning of the end of Imperial rule over the galaxy.

Successor 

Following their victory at the Battle of Endor, a provisional New Republic was officially formed by Alliance members. This, combined with the Imperial power vacuum, political infighting, and Operation Cinder—Palpatine's scorched earth contingency plan—encouraged thousands of inhabited planets to either declare independence from the collapsing Empire or defect to the Alliance.

The New Republic found itself with no shortage of recruits and resources: the declining popularity of the Empire pushed many long time Imperial loyalists to the Rebel cause, including those of Inferno Squadron, who after Operation Cinder, which saw the destruction of countless Imperial worlds, opened the eyes of many to the atrocities of the Empire. Even the most dedicated Imperials such as Inferno Squadron commander Iden Versio were moved to defect after the witnessing the destruction of her homeworld Vardos. Finally realizing the Empire's propaganda had deceived them, many Imperials began to feel shame over their actions, in particular over the destruction of Alderaan.

Despite fact that the New Republic was now winning the war, had a lot more resources than before—and a lot more recruits—the New Republic was suffering from logistic nightmares. The decentralized structure that served them well became a liability; described as "a ragtag force strategically ill-fed and cobbled together of incompatible ships and squadrons". The Alliance Fleet shifted military doctrine; the guerrilla warfare aspect of the grand strategy was de-emphasized, and conventional forces took over the primary prosecution of the war.  Once the New Republic became powerful enough, the Alliance Fleet was reorganized into the New Republic Military, charged with the defense of the New Republic.

About a year after the Battle of Endor, the Rebellion defeated Imperial forces during the Battle of Jakku and formally established the New Republic. Thus, the Galactic Civil War came to a close. Three decades later, by the time of The Force Awakens, the New Republic backed the Resistance army, a successor of the Alliance, to stand against the First Order, a new military power formed by hardline remnants from the Empire.

Legends

After Disney's acquisition of the franchise, Lucasfilm announced in 2014 that previous works outside the theatrical films and The Clone Wars would no longer be considered canon, but began to be republished under the Legends banner.

According to Star Wars: The Roleplaying Game, the Cantham House Meetings of Coruscant, including the participation of Senators Mon Mothma and Bail Organa, take place with the purpose of discussing the formation of a Galactic Alliance in opposition to Palpatine's Galactic Empire. In addition, the RPG tells that although throughout the galaxy many sectors are already fighting against Imperial interests, resistance is relatively quiet until the incident on the planet Ghorman, which takes place 18 years before the Battle of Yavin. The incident begins when an Imperial military cruiser commanded by Captain Wilhuff Tarkin is blocked by peaceful anti-Empire protesters who refuse to move off the ship's landing pad. With implied permission from the Emperor, Tarkin lands the ship anyway, injuring and killing many, an incident that history would record as the Ghorman Massacre. The myriad of civilizations which are fighting the Empire continue to grow in number and progressively coalesce into a ragtag organization known as the Resistance. They intend upon removing the evil Emperor, but the growing ruthlessness of the Imperial state forces them into secrecy, as they are initially unable to undermine the Empire's regime. The RPG tells that part of the strategy of the Rebel Alliance is the Doctrine of Space Denial, wherein the Rebellion would attack Imperial shipping frigates in hit and run raids, both to disrupt Imperial supplies and operations, and also to loot desperately needed materials. These Rebel starfighters were equipped with hyperdrive capability along prearranged routes which would allow this kind of harassment and escape before the Empire may react.
The video game The Force Unleashed presents a differing view of the Alliance's beginnings, hinting that the Emperor actually secretly pushed for its formation. Palpatine clandestinely bids for the creation of another opposing force, intent on starting yet another war in order to consolidate his power with the fledgling Empire, just as he had done earlier with the Confederacy of Independent Systems. The Emperor orders his apprentice Darth Vader to use his own secret apprentice, Galen Marek (called "Starkiller"), as a pawn to gather together the Empire's enemies, manipulating him into believing that the intention is to start a rebellion. Vader quickly realizes that this is obviously a ploy by Palpatine in order to lure any significant rebels into a trap; however, it is unclear whether Vader (or the Emperor) had intended for the Rebellion to survive. At the supposedly secret meeting known as the Corellian Treaty, Mon Mothma, Bail Organa, Garm Bel Iblis, Jedi-General Rahm Kota, and others meet to formally create the Rebellion against the Empire. However, the proceedings are ambushed by Vader under orders from the Emperor, whom had actually secretly orchestrated the Treaty himself in order to gather all the Rebel leaders together and eliminate them. Starkiller, now aligned with the Rebellion after two betrayals by his former master, manages to save the principal founders from the Empire, though at the cost of his own life. Regrouping on Kashyyyk, the Senators formally proclaim an open Declaration of Rebellion, which states the grievances of the Empire against the Alliance to Restore the Republic and concludes with an open threat to depose the Emperor. This marks the formal "founding" of the Rebel Alliance, and Galen Marek's family crest is chosen by Leia as its official symbol. Thus, the Rebel Alliance is effectively founded by Darth Vader himself, and, by extension, Emperor Palpatine, though it is clear neither had imagined that the Alliance would actually ever become a serious threat. The Galactic Civil War consequently ensues, during which the Rebellion confronts the Empire many times throughout the galaxy.
Empire at War depicts various allies contributing secretly to the Alliance, slowly making the united Rebel Force more powerful. The most notable equipment contributions include the defection of the Incom Corporation staff and all relevant material involved in the development of an advanced spacefighter, the X-wing.
A "Declaration of Rebellion" was depicted in the 1990 book The Star Wars Rebel Alliance Sourcebook.
After its victory on Endor, the Rebellion was temporarily stationed there and renamed the "Alliance of Free Planets".

Members
Canon members:
General Leia Organa
Senator Bail Organa
Admiral Raddus – Captain of the Profundity
Nien Nunb – Rebel Engineer and pilot
Han Solo – Captain of the Millennium Falcon 
Hera Syndulla – Pilot, leader of the Phoenix Squadron
Commander Sato
Jyn Erso – Member of the Rogue One group

Founders
 Senator Bana Breemu – Co-founder; early constituting member (deceased)
 Senator Garm Bel Iblis – Co-founder; financed private army to fight against the Empire; rejoined Alliance during the Thrawn campaign.
 Senator Bail Organa of the Imperial Senate (deceased)
 Senator Mon Mothma of the Imperial Senate

Senior civil government and military high command
 Col Serra – Commander of Renegade Squadron
 Ylenic It'kla – Commander and Jedi Knight who escaped Order 66, serving as a personal aide to Bail Organa on Alderaan. Works with Alderaanian authorities to coordinate rebel activity. 
 Qu Rahn – General and Jedi Master who survived Order 66, mostly due to his connection and training with Yoda. 
 Rahm Kota – General and former Jedi Master who survived Order 66, thanks to the aid of his own private militia. 
 Echuu Shen-Jon – General and Jedi Master who survived Order 66, thanks to his exile on Krant.
 Talon Karrde – General and former smuggler who aided the New Republic during the Thrawn campaign.

See also
 Galactic Republic
 Galactic Empire
 New Republic

Brief list of appearances
Star Wars: Episode III – Revenge of the Sith (2005; founded in a deleted scene)
Solo: A Star Wars Story (2018)
Star Wars Rebels (2014–2018)
Rogue One: A Star Wars Story (2016)
Star Wars: Episode IV – A New Hope (1977)
Star Wars: Episode V – The Empire Strikes Back (1980)
Star Wars: Episode VI – Return of the Jedi (1983)
Star Wars Battlefront (2015)
Star Wars Battlefront II (2017)

Notes

References

External links

 
 

Star Wars governments
Fictional military organizations
Fictional revolutionary organizations
Fiction about space warfare
Fictional elements introduced in 1977